James McDonnell (born 12 January 2000) is an  international rugby league footballer who plays as a  or  forward for the Leeds Rhinos in the Super League.

Background
McDonnell played his amateur rugby league for Wigan St Judes.

Club career

Wigan Warriors
McDonnell made his Super League debut in round 14 of the 2020 Super League season for the Warriors against St Helens where Wigan went on to lose 42–0 against a much more experienced St Helens squad.

York City Knights (loan)
On 14 May 2021 it was reported that he had signed for the York City Knights in the RFL Championship on one-month loan.

Leigh Centurions (DR)
McDonnell spent the 2022 season on duel registration with Leigh Centurions.

International career
McDonnell received his first international call up for the England Knights in early 2022. Later that year he was called up to represent Ireland in the 2021 Rugby League World Cup.

References

External links
Wigan Warriors profile
Ireland profile

2000 births
Living people
Bradford Bulls players
English people of Irish descent
English rugby league players
Ireland national rugby league team players
Leeds Rhinos players
Leigh Leopards players
Rugby league centres
Rugby league players from Wigan
Rugby league second-rows
Wigan Warriors players
York City Knights players